Kasra may refer to:

Letter

People
 A variant of the Persian name Khosrow
 Kasra Anghaee, Iranian-Swiss poet
 Kasra Naji, Iranian journalist
 Kasra Nouri, Iranian rights activist and blogger
 Leila Kasra, Iranian poet
 Mona Kasra, Iranian-American academic

Places
 Taq Kasra, a Sassanid-era Persian monument

Other

 Kesra, a town and commune in the Siliana Governorate, Tunisia
 Karra (disambiguation)
 Kesra, a type of bread in Algerian cuisine